Bealbury is a hamlet in St Mellion civil parish in east Cornwall, England, United Kingdom. It is two miles south of Callington.

References

Hamlets in Cornwall